Charmaine Margaret Dragun (21 March 19782 November 2007) was an Australian broadcast journalist and presenter. She was a co-anchor on Ten Eyewitness News. Dragun, who had been diagnosed with depression and had a history of anorexia, died by suicide on 2 November 2007.

Education and career
Dragun graduated from the Western Australian Academy of Performing Arts with a degree in broadcast journalism. She began her career as a radio journalist and newsreader at Perth radio stations 6PR and 96FM. She was nominated for Young Journalist of the Year and won both the Australian and state Best Radio Reports award.

Dragun switched from radio to television when she was offered a position at Network Ten. She started out reporting a wide range of stories from entertainment news to major national news stories and eventually began court reporting regularly. She occasionally filled in as a presenter on Perth's Ten News First and on 4 July 2005, she was appointed as permanent news anchor for the show, which was broadcast from Network Ten's Sydney studio TEN at Pyrmont, New South Wales. She was a main co-anchor of Ten News First and also filled in on the national morning and weekend news bulletins and presented Sports Tonight on Fridays. Dragun's co-anchor, veteran broadcaster Tim Webster, described her as "one of the most professional I've ever seen, very meticulous...if she made a mistake she was distraught about it."

Personal life

Perth
Charmaine Margaret Dragun was born in Perth, Western Australia to Estelle and Michael Dragun. According to her mother, Dragun was a perfectionist and developed anorexia while she was attending university at the WA Academy of Performing Arts and continued to have problems related to anorexia periodically for the next several years. When she was 18 years old, she saw a psychiatrist to address the eating disorder and was also diagnosed with depression and started on a class of antidepressants called selective serotonin reuptake inhibitors (SSRIs), that she continued taking for several years.

Dragun was engaged to Simon Struthers, a forensic investigator, whom she had been dating since she was 16 years old, and they were planning to marry on Dragun's 30th birthday.

In 2004, eight months before moving to Sydney, Dragun told her mother that her medication made her feel numb and she started seeing a psychiatrist who recommended that Dragun discontinue medication altogether. Her mother said that Dragun's symptoms started to go "down hill" after six weeks off antidepressants. She moved back home with her parents and temporarily ended her relationship with Struthers, stating that she could not give him happiness. She restarted pharmacotherapy on a new class of antidepressants, serotonin–norepinephrine reuptake inhibitors (SNRIs), prescribed by her general practitioner (GP), which she took until 2007.

Sydney
When she moved to Sydney in 2005, Dragun and Struthers reunited and after a few months, were living together in Sydney. Dragun had difficulty adjusting to the new city and being so far from family. She started working with a clinical psychologist there that she reportedly had a good rapport with, according to Dragun's mother.

Around August or September 2007, Dragun's symptoms worsened and her psychologist recommended that Dragun consult a psychiatrist about adjusting her medication. In October 2007, her new psychiatrist had initiated a cross-taper to change Dragun from the SNRI to a different brand of SSRI, a change which can take up to six weeks to take effect. Dragun initially told her mother that she was optimistic about the switch, but after less than three weeks, she told her mother over the phone that she was having thoughts of suicide and that she felt "worthless." Dragun committed suicide a few days later.

Suicide
On 2 November 2007, at age 29, Dragun committed suicide near The Gap in Sydney's Eastern Suburbs. According to news reports, Dragun sat near the gully for around two hours, something she had done several times in the weeks leading up to her suicide, and sent a farewell text message to Struthers before jumping to her death. Witnesses who had seen someone sitting near the popular suicide spot had contacted the police, but Dragun was dead by the time officers arrived. A funeral was held ten days later at All Saints Church in Greenwood, Western Australia.

During 2010, an official inquest into the medical support surrounding Dragun at the time of her death was held by the Coroner's Court in Glebe, New South Wales, a suburb of Sydney. The deputy state coroner stated that the ease of access to The Gap had been a causal factor. He also speculated that Dragun may have been misdiagnosed with depression, but according to The Australian, he also said that her medication did not "put [suicidal] ideas into her head or cause her to behave in an irrational way and with no control over her actions".

References

1978 births
2007 deaths
Australian people of Croatian descent
Australian television journalists
People educated at Corpus Christi College, Perth
People from Perth, Western Australia
People with mood disorders
Suicides by jumping in Australia
Suicides in New South Wales
10 News First presenters
2007 suicides